Allosso is a town in south-eastern Ivory Coast. It is a sub-prefecture of Alépé Department in La Mé Region, Lagunes District.

The town—but not the sub-prefecture—is sometimes referred to as Allosso 2.

Allosso was a commune until March 2012, when it became one of 1126 communes nationwide that were abolished.

References

Sub-prefectures of La Mé
Former communes of Ivory Coast